William M. Cox (February 4, 1942 – November 19, 2017) was an American highway administrator. Cox joined the Federal Highway Administration from Madisonville, Kentucky, where he was the Senior Vice-President of a large trucking firm.

He was one of the youngest persons ever elected to the Kentucky legislature. During 1976, in addition to an appointment as special assistant to the Governor of Kentucky, Cox served as President of the Kentucky Motor Transportation Association and Vice-Chairman of the Kentucky Public Service Commission.

As Federal Highway Administrator, Cox was a major force in the development of comprehensive surface transportation legislation. He was noted for his untiring efforts in streamlining administrative processes by eliminating or minimizing excessive regulations and "red tape." Under his leadership, the FHWA made significant progress in minority employment and participation of minority business enterprises in FHWA programs.

Cox was mayor of Madisonville from 1990 through 1994.

On November 19, 2017, Cox died peacefully surrounded by his immediate family at 5:11 a.m. Eastern Time on Sunday at Baptist Health Hospital in Louisville, Kentucky.

References

1942 births
2017 deaths
People from Madisonville, Kentucky
Administrators of the Federal Highway Administration
Members of the Kentucky House of Representatives
Carter administration personnel